William Boyton, also known as William Bower, was the member of the Parliament of England for Salisbury for the parliaments of 1402 and 1406.

References 

Members of Parliament for Salisbury
Year of birth unknown
Reeves (England)
Year of death unknown
English MPs 1402
English MPs 1406